The Noble Hardee Mansion is a historic building in Savannah, Georgia, United States. It is located at 3 West Gordon Street, in the southwestern residential block of Monterey Square, and was built in 1860. It is part of the Savannah Historic District. The home, consisting of 3.5 storeys and containing fifteen fireplaces, was built for Noble Andrew Hardee, a cotton factor and owner of N. A. Hardee Company. He died seven years after the building's construction. From the late 1990s until around 2022, the building was occupied by Alex Raskin Antiques. The entrance to the store was at 441 Bull Street on the building's eastern side.

The building was restored in the late 19th century, with additions made over the years removed.

In the 1940s, it formed part of Armstrong Junior College.

21st United States president Chester A. Arthur visited his relative Henry Triplett Botts at the mansion.

The building was featured in the 1995 movie Something to Talk About, utilized by Julia Roberts as a surreptitous meeting place.

In 2022, Ralston College was considering using the building.

Architectural detail

See also 
 Buildings in Savannah Historic District

References

External links
"Once abandoned Civil War mansion packed with antiques | Alex Raskin Antiques , Savannah" - ChadGallivanter, YouTube, February 14, 2017

Houses in Savannah, Georgia
Houses completed in 1860
Monterey Square (Savannah) buildings
Savannah Historic District